The 2011–12 Ole Miss Rebels men's basketball team represented the University of Mississippi in the sport of basketball during the 2011–12 college basketball season. The Rebels competed in Division I of the National Collegiate Athletic Association (NCAA) and the Southeastern Conference (SEC). They were led by head coach Andy Kennedy, and played their home games at Tad Smith Coliseum on the university's Oxford, Mississippi campus.

They were selected to play in the 2012 National Invitation Tournament as a #2 seed, where they were defeated by Illinois State in overtime.

Previous season
The Rebels finished the 2010–11 season 20–14, 7–9 in SEC play and lost in the first round of the NIT to California.

Roster

Schedule

|-
!colspan=9| Exhibition

|-
!colspan=9| Regular season

|-
!colspan=9| SEC Regular Season

|-
!colspan=9| SEC tournament

|-
!colspan=9|National Invitation Tournament

References

Ole Miss Rebels men's basketball seasons
Ole Miss
Ole Miss
Ole Miss Rebels
Ole Miss Rebels